Mike Feinberg is a co-founder of the KIPP (Knowledge Is Power Program) Foundation.

History  
Feinberg graduated from the University of Pennsylvania and later joined Teach For America (TFA), where he taught fifth grade for three years.

While at TFA, Feinberg and his fellow corps member Dave Levin came up with the idea for KIPP, (a network of public charter schools)     KIPP was founded in 1994. As of February 2018, KIPP is a national network of 209 high-performing public schools with more than 90,000 students.

In 2000, Mike Feinberg, Dave Levin, and Doris and Don Fisher co-founded the KIPP Foundation to help train school leaders to expand KIPP by opening more KIPP schools.

Awards and recognition 
Mike Feinberg and Dave Levin earned many awards, such as the 2006 S. Roger Horchow Award (Jefferson Award) for Greatest Public Service by a Private Citizen, an honorary degree from Yale University, the Thomas Fordham Foundation Price for Valor, the Charles Bronfman Prize, and the Presidential Citizen’s medal.

Their efforts became the story told by Jay Mathews, in his best-selling book, Work Hard. Be Nice: How Two Inspired Teachers Created America’s Most Promising Schools. KIPP has also inspired Paul Tough to write How Children Succeed: Grit, Curiosity, and the Hidden Power of Character.

Alleged Misconduct and Resignation 
In February 2018, Feinberg was removed from his position at KIPP due to sexual misconduct allegations involving a KIPP middle school student in the late 1990s and two KIPP employees in the early 2000s.  Feinberg denied the accusation by the middle school student, and reached a financial settlement with one of the two KIPP employees.

References

External links 
 KIPP
 Past Winners of Harold W. McGraw, Jr. Prize in Education

Date of birth missing (living people)
Living people
American educators
American founders
University of Pennsylvania alumni
Teach For America alumni
Year of birth missing (living people)